A heteronuclear molecule is a molecule composed of atoms of more than one chemical element. For example, a molecule of water (H2O) is heteronuclear because it has atoms of two different elements, hydrogen (H) and oxygen (O).

Similarly, a heteronuclear ion is an ion that contains atoms of more than one chemical element. For example, the carbonate ion is heteronuclear because it has atoms of carbon (C) and oxygen (O). The lightest heteronuclear ion is the helium hydride ion (HeH+). This is in contrast to a homonuclear ion, which contains all the same kind of atom, such as the dihydrogen cation, or atomic ions that only contain one atom such as the hydrogen anion (H−).

See also
Homonuclear molecule
Chemical compound

Molecules
Sets of chemical elements